The Ait Yafelman (Berber: Ayt Yafelman) are a large Berber tribal confederation of the eastern High Atlas of Morocco, with their capital at Imilchil. They consist of four tribes: Ayt Morghad, Ayt Haddidou, Ayt Izdeg and Ayt Yehia.  These tribes created the alliance in the 17th century to counter the expansion of their Ait Atta neighbours. The Ait Yafelman speak Central Atlas Tamazight.

History 

The Ayt Yafelmans lived before the 16th century in the south of the Oriental High Atlas, in the Todgha, the Ghriss, the Dades, the Imedghass and Upper Ziz Gorges.

From the sixteenth century they exceeded the passes of Jbel El Ayachi and Jbel Maaskar to occupy the vast land they live today, and M. Peyron limited as follows: "the whole High Atlas between Tounfite, Midelt and Tizi N'Telghoumt to the North, and Msemrir, Guelmim, Errachidia and Boudnib to the South; and the valley of the Oued Ait Aissa as the furthermost line of spreading to the East, and the upper Oued El Abid, the Assif Melloul and Dades to the West.

This vast territory is therefore in direct contact with this tribes:
 Ait Atta to the Southwest,
 Ait Soukhman to the West,
 Ait Myeld to the North,
 Ait Youssi and Ait El Haj to the North East, and
 Ait Saghrouchen in the East.
The country where the Yafelmans live is a mountainous area where Jbel El Ayachi rises to 3737 meters.

Bibliography

Notes and references 

Berber peoples and tribes
Berbers in Morocco